In 2022, Jignesh and Yash Patel painted a mural of Elizabeth II, following her death. Located outside the Hounslow East Underground tube station, the mural took two days to complete and was funded in part by the Indian Diaspora in UK (IDUK) group via GoFundMe. The mural has received a mixed reaction.

References

2020s paintings
2022 works
Cultural depictions of Elizabeth II
Monuments and memorials in the United Kingdom
Murals in the United Kingdom
Paintings of people